Purbasthali is a village with a police station and a rail station in Purbasthali II CD block in Kalna subdivision of Purba Bardhaman district.  It is located 120 km north from Kolkata.  Also known as Chupi Char, it lies on the banks of a large oxbow lake created by the Ganges river and is only 8 km from the old and holy town of Nabadwip.  The 2–3 km long lake attracts migrants and water birds. The Purbasthali area has a fairly high level of arsenic in the ground water. And this place was popular for teaching ancient language Vedic Sanskrit, The famous & oldest educational institution in this village is "Purbasthali Nilmani Brahmachari Institution" which was founded in the year of 1887 by Dr. (Prof) sir Upendranath Brahmachari.

Geography

Location 
Purbasthali lies close on the Tropic of Cancer. Purbasthali is a large block with a number of villages adjoining a large oxbow lake, created by the river Ganga, on its Western bank, in Purba Bardhaman district of West Bengal. It is 120 km north from Calcutta. On the Eastern bank of the river lies the old and holy town of Nabadwip. The entire Gangetic Isle complex of Purbasthali extends  between the geographical coordinates from 88° 19' 45" to 88° 22' E longitude and 23° 26' to 23° 26'45" N latitude.

Police station
Purbasthali police station has jurisdiction over parts of Purbasthali I and Purbasthali II CD Blocks. The area covered is 180.3 km2.

Physiography
Purbasthali is located on the agriculturally rich alluvial plains between the Bhagirathi, Ajay and Damodar rivers. Temperatures in this region varies from 17-18 °C in winter to 30-32 °C in summer.
The whole area of Purbasthali is covered with greenery, fruit-gardens, flower-gardens and agricultural fields producing a considerable amount of vegetables and fruits for export.

Purbasthali region is located in the flood plains two major rivers Damodar and the Ganga. The wetland with the river course form a half moon shape between Nabadwip and Purbasthali . Topographic configuration is the typical monotonously low dipping Gangetic plain of West Bengal with an average height of 14 metres above mean sea level. During monsoon river gets flooded, with the water level within the wetland getting higher and under heavy rains the enclosed islands get submerged. The area is extremely rich in alluvial soil content. Hence an intense agriculture is practiced on both sides of the river. Main crops Rice, maize, corn, jute, mustard, potato and all sorts of vegetables are the main produce. There are a number of fruit orchards and horticulture gardens flank the river course. Even on the riverine isle and sandy river banks cultivation goes on during the post monsoon period from September till June. Banks of the channel and river course is dotted with villages under dense tree cover while paddy fields and grass lands border the wetland.

The Oxbow Lake 
The oxbow lake of Purbasthali sprawls over an area 3.50 km2. in the post monsoon period of winter months. Beyond the lake, this river fed eco-system also forms a cluster of large and small islands comprise Purbasthali Gangetic Isle Complex. Formed by the meandering river Ganga, over last 40 years, the area has transformed into a closed loop, allowing emergence of the oxbow lake. This channel of water course in a length of about 10 kilometers feeds the oxbow lake with thin connectivity with the main river with shoals forming at the river mouth. The process of rapid and growing sedimentation threatens to cut off the channel in near future.

Thus the present course of the main river shifts further eastward while the original bed holds the loop with stranded water. Remote sensing images of the wetland clearly establishes the differences of turbidity between the main river and the wetland which has sandy clay sediment and crystal clear waters because of sedimentation of suspended solid particles in the stagnant stretches.

Geology 
On the basis of Geo-tectonic considerations, Purbasthali-Nabadwip region has been undergoing steady changes since time immemorial. River course has changed many times, due to geo-tectonic movements, forming small islands and oxbow lakes over last hundreds of years. The tectonic plates here are under constant collision resulted the changes in river course. A comparative study of the Survey of India topographic sheet published in 1973 with the remote sensing images of 1989-90&1992-93 coupled with observations from recent field visits, confirms the process of formation of this vast wetland besides some small but constant changes in topography occurring every year.

Hydrology 
This wetland is still connected with the river Ganga(Bhagirathi) and its hydrology is mainly controlled by the river Ganga. During rainy season, when the river gets flooded, the water level within the wetland gets higher and some times the island within the wetland also gets flooded. Although, it has a huge open catchment area all around the wetland, that contributes the surface run-off into this wetland, yet it has little effect on the hydrology.

Water regime 
During monsoon period, specially during flood, the whole area get inundated as reported by the local people. However, in normal years, the spatial extent of water within this wetland varies from 2.075 sg.km. in pre-monsoon period to 3.15 sg.km. in post-monsoon period.

Water quality 
The water quality data of Purbasthali Wetland, presented in Table, shows the excellent qualities of all the parameters. The water of Purbasthali is clearest of all the wetland studied by the visiting teams so far.

Avi-fauna
Oxbow lake is famous here for thousands of migratory birds coming here from far-off places including Siberia in winters. Hundreds of bird species (Birds of Purbasthali) can be seen here. People from far-off places come here for birding.

Avi-flora

The vegetation of the area is portrayed by the arborescent species, for example, Simul (Salmalia malabarica Schott.), Neem (Azadirachta indica), Amlaki (Phyllanthus embica), Coconut (cocos nucifera), Khejur (Phoenix dactylifera L.), Tal (Borassus flabellifer L.), Bat (Ficus bengalensis L.), Asvattha (Ficus religiosa L.), Palas (Butea frondosa), Krishnachuda (Caesalpinia Pulcherrima), Am (Mangifera indica L.) and shrubby species, for example, ashsheoda (Glycosmis pentaphylla Corr.),  Rajanigandha (Polyanthes tuberosa Willd.), Ghentu or Bhat (Clerodendron infortunatum Gaertn.), Kurabaka (Barleria Cristata), Gulancha (Tinospora cordifolia), Tulsi (Ocimum sanctum),

From Poachers' field to a Birders' Paradise
On  a bird watching mission in one winter morning of 1989, THE JUNGLEES (www.junglees.org), headed by the Secretary Mr. Raja Chatterjee discovered Purbasthali Gangetic Isle complex - tucked away in the remote course of river Ganga.

It was a Mission Apocalypse. In a day-long sailing sojourn, THE JUNGLEES beheld flocks of Migratory Waterfowls aptly transforming the whole region a fair ground of feathered guests. Their booty was rich with a mammoth check-list of 102 species of water birds and arboreal glittered with Baikal Teals, Spoon Bills- nowhere could be seen in Bengal.

This wintering ground located on geographic co-ordinates of 23.25N & 88.22E is essentially a cluster of riverine isle scattered  over a 20 km long stretch  on Ganga that flows forming oxbows, bordering the populace of Mayapur in the east and Purbasthali in the west in districts of Nadia and Burdwan.

Their subsequent surveys and interactions with local villagers soon revealed that each winter countless ducks fall prey to meta hungry poachers'  gun, leading to the economics of seasonal restaurant supply.

Undaunted, they responded to this challenge by promptly launching on an intense anti-poaching campaign in the region against the menace. In the crusade, they reach out to involve the local school students, village board, political parties, police boatmen and fishermen through National Environmental Awareness Campaign over the years 1990-91, 92, 93 and 1994, 1995, sponsored by the Ministry of Environment and Forests, Govt. of India.

Inspired, they conducted the Mid-Winter Waterfowl census in 1992 under the aegis of International Waterfowl and Wetland Research Bureau (London) and Asian Wetland Bureau (Malaysia), following which Purbasthali Gangetic Isle complex emerged as the largest Wintering Ground of Migratory Birds in Bengal.

THE JUNGLEES succeeded in convincing all stake holders the problems and prospects of Purbasthali. And offered an alternate economics vis-a-vis unfolded our proposed Eco-Tourism plans and a Biological Research Station, for rural benefits and conservation.

Their endeavour is now best rewarded through a gift of land by the local village board where facilities have been set up. Purbasthali now receives the maximum number of eco-tourists in Bengal during the winter months.

THE JUNGLEES thought Globally on Bird Migration ( which is a Global phenomenon ) and acted Locally to protect them for a good rural economy through Eco-Tourism.

Demographics
As per the 2011 Census of India, Purbasthali had a total population of 4,207 of which 2,128 (51%) were males and 2,079 (49%) were females. Population below 6 years was 379. The total number of literates in Purbasthali was 3,215 (83.99% of the population over 6 years).

Transport 
Purbasthali railway station is 73 km from Bandel and 8 km from Nabadwipdham on the Bandel-Katwa Branch Line of Eastern Railway.

By road, from Bandel on S.T.K.K.Road (Saptagram TribeniKalna Katwa Road) it is 80 km towards north, 38 km towards south from Katwa.

Notable personalities 
 Dr. Upendranath Brahmachari (1873–1941), the renowned scientist, hailed from Purbasthali.   
 Krishnanath Nyayapanchanan (1833–1911) Sanskrit scholar, authority in Nyaya, Mimangsa and other branches of Indian philosophy
 Baneswar Sarkar won the national award for weaving in 1998. 
Krishnadas Kaviraj-He is famous for writing the biography Sri Chaitanyadev, Chaitanya Charitamrita. He was born at Jhamatpur village near Katwa on 1496. The other works are Gobindalalmitra, Adwayitasutra Kadcha, Swajparbanam and Bagmayikana.
Batukeshawar Dutta-was an Indian Bengali revolutionary and independence fighter in the early 1900s. He is best known for having exploded a few bombs, along with Bhagat Singh, in the Central Legislative Assembly in New Delhi on 8 April 1929. After they were arrested, tried and imprisoned for life, he and Bhagat Singh initiated a historic hunger strike protesting against the abusive treatment of Indian political prisoners, and eventually secured some rights for them. He was also a member of the Hindustan Socialist Republican Association()

Healthcare
Purbasthali Rural Hospital at Purbasthali (with 30 beds) is the main medical facility in Purbasthali II CD block. There are primary health centres at Kubajpur, PO Rai Dogachhia (with 4 beds), Nimdah, PO Belerhat (with 6 beds), Patuli (with 10 beds) and Singari, PO Laxmipur (with 10 beds).
There are also 74 Primary Health Centres, 2 Medical Institutions (State Govt. Undertaking),1 Medical Institutions (Central Govt. Undertaking)

See also 
 Healthcare in West Bengal

External links 
 Birding at purbasthali - birds checklist at bengalbirds.info 
 Accommodation at Purbasthali - Cottages

References 

Survey Report on Oxbow Lake of  Purbasthali, 1998 by Institute of Environmental Studies and Wetland Management.

Villages in Purba Bardhaman district
Tourist attractions in Purba Bardhaman district
Lakes of West Bengal